Allium chiwui is a plant species endemic to the Chinese Province of Hebei. The plant grows on slopes at elevations of 2100–2500 m.

Allium chiwui produces bulbs up to 15 mm in diameter. Scapes are up to 30 cm tall. Leaves are linear, flat, shorter than the scape. Umbels are hemispheric, with many white or yellow flowers crowded together.

References

chiwui
Onions
Flora of Hebei
Plants described in 1937